Jalen Armand Reagor (born January 2, 1999) is an American football wide receiver for the Minnesota Vikings of the National Football League (NFL). He played college football at TCU and was selected by the Philadelphia Eagles in the first round of the 2020 NFL Draft.

Early years
Reagor was born January 2, 1999, to Ishia Johnson and former NFL defensive end Montae Reagor.  He grew up in Waxahachie, Texas and attended Waxahachie High School, where he became a star in both football and track & field for the Indians.

On the football field, Reagor produced back to back 1,000-yard receiving seasons for Waxahachie head coach and former NFL quarterback Jon Kitna and was selected to play in the 2017 Under Armour All-America Game. His track & field career culminated with a gold medal in the long jump at the 2017 Texas High School state meet.

College career

Reagor enrolled at Texas Christian University in Fort Worth, Texas in the summer of 2017 and made his collegiate debut in the Horned Frogs' season opener against Jackson State with two receptions in TCU's 63–0 victory. He scored his first collegiate touchdown two weeks later when he caught a Hail Mary pass from quarterback Kenny Hill on the last play of the first half in a victory over SMU. He scored touchdowns in each of the last four games of the season, which included TCU's first-ever appearance in the Big 12 Championship Game and a win in the 2017 Alamo Bowl over Stanford. For his efforts, he was named Co-Big 12 Offensive Freshman of the Year.

Prior to his sophomore season, Reagor switched to jersey number 1 from the 18 he'd worn in 2017. That fall, he became the Frogs' go-to receiver in a season in which they used three different starting quarterbacks, becoming the first TCU receiver to top 1,000 yards since Josh Doctson. He had a streak of 7 straight games with a receiving touchdown, which included a win against Oklahoma State in which he also recorded his first career 100-yard rushing game [233 total yards, 121 rushing, 91 receiving,  21 returning kickoffs]. After the season, he was named 2nd-team All-Big 12.  In his 2019 season, he had 43 catches for 611 yards. Reagor declared for the 2020 NFL Draft after this season, forgoing his final year of eligibility.

College statistics

Professional career

Philadelphia Eagles

2020 season

Reagor was selected by the Philadelphia Eagles in the first round with the 21st overall pick in the 2020 NFL Draft, becoming the highest-drafted wide receiver to come from TCU since former All-American Josh Doctson in 2016. On July 20, 2020, Reagor signed a 4-year $13.3 million contract with the team, with a fifth-year team option. Reagor sustained a shoulder injury in training camp but recovered enough to play in Week 1.

On September 13, 2020, Reagor made his NFL debut against the Washington Football Team, finishing with one reception for 55 yards in the 17–27 loss. He was placed on injured reserve on September 30, 2020, after suffering a ligament tear in his thumb. He was activated on October 31, 2020.
In Week 8 against the Dallas Cowboys on Sunday Night Football, Reagor recorded his first career touchdown reception during the 23–9 win.

In Week 13 against the Green Bay Packers, Reagor returned a punt for a 73-yard touchdown during the 30–16 loss.  This was Reagor's first career punt returned for a touchdown.

2021 season

In Week 12 of the 2021 NFL Season, Reagor dropped two passes, including a touchdown, in the final drive against the New York Giants in the 13–7 loss.

In the Wild Card round against the Tampa Bay Buccaneers, Reagor muffed two punts, losing one, in the Eagles' 31–15 loss.

Minnesota Vikings

2022 season

On August 31, 2022, Reagor was traded to the Minnesota Vikings in exchange for a 2023 seventh-round pick as well as a 2024 conditional fourth-round pick. After the trade, Reagor decided he would change his number to 5. He stated on Twitter: "The number 5 symbolizes Spiritual growth, Self confidence, Freedom, Curiosity, and Change. #5 it is, let’s go crazy!"

NFL career statistics

Regular season

Playoffs

References

External links
Minnesota Vikings bio
TCU Horned Frogs bio

1999 births
Living people
American football wide receivers
People from Waxahachie, Texas
Waxahachie High School alumni
Players of American football from Texas
Sportspeople from the Dallas–Fort Worth metroplex
TCU Horned Frogs football players
Philadelphia Eagles players
Minnesota Vikings players